Justin Evan Perelini Purdie (born 13 May 1980 in Wellington, New Zealand) is a New Zealand rugby union player of Samoan origin. He plays at flanker and won 8 caps for the Samoa national rugby union team and represented them at the 2007 Rugby World Cup.

References

1980 births
Living people
Rugby union flankers
Samoan rugby union players
Samoa international rugby union players
Samoan expatriate rugby union players
Expatriate rugby union players in New Zealand
Expatriate rugby union players in France
Samoan expatriate sportspeople in New Zealand
Samoan expatriate sportspeople in France
Wellington rugby union players